Éric Anselme (born 20 May 1978) is a French former professional rugby league footballer who played in the 1990s and 2000s, former head coach of RC Albi XIII in the Elite One Championship and current head coach of the U19 National French Team. He played at club level for Toulouse Olympique and Leeds Rhinos Heritage number 1373. He has previously played for St Gaudens and Racing Club Albi XIII in the French Rugby League Championship competition.

In the early part of his career he played numerous times in the Halifax RLFC Alliance team Heritage number 1105, and made his début in the 32–0 defeat by Paris, played in Narbonne.

He has also appeared for the French national side on 29 occasions, including on the 2001 tour of New Zealand and Papua New Guinea, and at the 2008 Rugby League World Cup.

References

External links
Super League profile
Statistics at rugbyleagueproject.org
Leeds sign French international
Profile at leedsrugby
Éric Anselme at to13.com

1978 births
Living people
France national rugby league team players
French rugby league coaches
French rugby league players
Halifax R.L.F.C. players
Leeds Rhinos players
Penrith Panthers players
Racing Club Albi XIII players
Rugby league centres
Rugby league second-rows
Saint-Gaudens Bears players
Toulouse Olympique players